Totalitarian architecture is a type of architecture or an architectural style approved by and often preferred by dictatorships and governments of totalitarian regimes, intended to strengthen and spread their ideology. The style of totalitarian architecture shows a preference for "classical symbolism and monumentality", drawing on simplified neo-Classicism and realism.

Many aspects of the culture in totalitarian countries have been described as supporting the leaders and the ideology of the regime. In 2009, Theodore Dalrymple criticized Le Corbusier as one of creators of totalitarian architecture. He described brutalist structures as an expression of totalitarianism given that their grand, concrete-based design involves destroying gentler, more-human places such as gardens. In 1949, George Orwell described the Ministry of Truth in Nineteen Eighty-Four as an "enormous, pyramidal structure of white concrete, soaring up terrace after terrace, three hundred metres into the air." The Times columnist Ben Macintyre wrote that it was "a prescient description of the sort of totalitarian architecture that would soon dominate the Communist bloc." In contrast to these views, several authors have seen brutalism and socialist realism as modernist art forms which brought an ethos and sensibility in art.

Overview

Terminology 
The term "totalitarian architecture" appeared in the scientific literature in connection with the comparison of German and Italian architecture with Soviet architecture. This type of architecture was described as "legacy of dictatorships", and includes Stalinist architecture, Fascist architecture, and Nazi architecture. Redevelopment of entire cities, such as Moscow, Rome, Berlin, and Bucharest, including the large-scale demolition of many individual historical buildings, was planned and accomplished to symbolize the glory and supremacy of totalitarian states and their leaders. Many new buildings were constructed, and among them the House of Soviets in Saint Petersburg has been described as "the purest form of totalitarian monumentality." While many examples of totalitarian architecture are European, particularly from the eras of Soviet Union and Nazi Germany, it has also been discussed in the context of other parts of the worlds, such as architecture of North Korea or the architecture of Communist China. In Japan, totalitarian architecture was presented in the form of the imperial style. According to art historian Yu Suzuki the totalitarian style in Japan was not uniform like in Germany or Italy due to the lack of a close relationship between the government and architects. Architect Nina Konovalova replied that such a relationship was not necessary because of the characteristics of the culture of that time. The unified architectural development was "unambiguously" presented through a system of competitions and through government orders.

Analysis 
According to historians of art, the totalitarian architecture of 20th century represents a variety of religious architecture, with prominent examples like Altar of the Fatherland in Rome, Russian State Library in Moscow built in 1929, or Lenin's Mausoleum similar to the Pyramid of Djoser. Other tombs‘ architectural typologies, such as Ho Chi Minh Mausoleum and Georgi Dimitrov Mausoleum, have been also described as examples of architecture promoting the communist political religion. Both Nazi and Fascist architectures served to sacralize their leaders.

The intended aim of totalitarian architecture has been described as strengthening and spreading its ideology, and they are an element of the state propaganda.  According to journal Esempi di Architettura, "Architecture and town planning have the potential to support and promote ideological propaganda. In many ways, totalitarian architecture represents the regime that builds it." These architectures are generally described as united by using the megalomania to portray a sense of power, majesty and virility. The style has been criticized for "congenital unwholesomeness" and its "desire to dominate", hiding "feelings of inferiority" and projecting a "massive ego" of totalitarian leaders.

 The Times columnist Ben Macintyre wrote that "Hitler, Stalin, Mao, Mussolini and Saddam all imagined vast cities constructed in their own honour. Stalin's Palace of the Soviets was to be higher than the Empire State Building. Hitler's Reich Chancellery was a deliberately theatrical statement, with towering brass doors 17ft high and the Führer's 4,000 sq ft 'study.' In 1984, written in 1948, George Orwell left a prescient description of the sort of totalitarian architecture that would soon dominate the Communist bloc, imposing and hideous: the Ministry of Truth, an "enormous, pyramidal structure of white concrete, soaring up terrace after terrace, three hundred metres into the air."

The totalitarian architecture was also described by the Council of Europe as a part of European cultural heritage. According to their website, "studying the architecture of Europe's totalitarian regimes, both the fascist and the communist ones, is a way to enhance the European identity in its unity and diversity. The idea of Europe originated from the wounds of World War II and the fall of Fascism and Nazism. It entered a new phase after the downfall of Communism, opening the way to a broader and more comprehensive idea of a Europe based on fundamental values such as political liberty, freedom of expression and assembly, democracy and the rule of law." Many buildings from the Communist era are in the state of decay, and the European cultural organization ATRIUM collects photographs of the abandoned buildings "that still stand as monuments to another time."

A number of buildings and memorials created by totalitarian regimes have been demolished, especially in Poland and Ukraine, based on the legislature such as The law On the Prohibition of Propagation of Communism or Any Other Totalitarian System Through The Names of All Public Buildings, Structures and Facilities A demolition of the Palace of Culture and Science in Poland was debated.

Views by Russian historians of art on the totalitarian architecture differ. Architect and architectural historian  wrote that the concept of totalitarian architecture is usually associated with Stalin's neoclassicism and that it "strives to symbolize an abstract idea by architectural means. Usually, this is the idea of the greatness of statehood and power."   , art historian and director of the Shchusev Museum of Architecture, noted that the concept of totalitarian architecture has become widespread in art criticism and journalism but "not all serious researchers perceive it as a correct concept." Ivan Sablin, art historian and senior researcher at the  objected to the negative connotation in the expression totalitarian architecture. He believes that the Stalinist, Nazi and Fascist architectures are nothing special, including even the use of swastika, represent a mixture of different architectural styles, such as neo-Classicism and monumentalism, and simply a legitimate part of the architectural history.

See also 
 Architectural propaganda
 Soviet urban planning ideologies of the 1920s
 Urban planning in communist countries
 Urban planning in Nazi Germany
 Utopian architecture

References

Further reading 
 Architecture As Propaganda in Twentieth-Century Totalitarian regimes,  by Håkan Hökerberg (editor), History and Heritage, Edizioni Polistampa (November 2, 2018), .

External links 
 ATRIUM - Architecture of Totalitarian Regimes of the 20th Century In Europe's Urban Memory by the Council of Europe

Architecture
Totalitarianism